The Treaty of Cession of Manuʻa, also known as the Deed of Cession of Manuʻa, was a treaty between Tui Manuʻa Elisala and the United States signed on 16 July 1904 that ceded the islands of Manuʻa to the United States, which now forms part of American Samoa. It came about because of the Second Samoan Civil War and the Tripartite Convention of 1899 between the United States, the United Kingdom, and the German Empire. It was ratified by the United States Congress by the Ratification Act of 1929.

See also 
 Treaty of Cession of Tutuila
 Tripartite Convention
 History of American Samoa

History of American Samoa
Treaties of Samoa
Treaties of the United States
Treaties concluded in 1904
1904 in American Samoa
Treaties entered into force in 1904
Treaties entered into force in 1929
1904 in American law
1904  in international relations
1900s in Samoa
American Samoa law
Politics of American Samoa